The 1931 Bowling Green Falcons football team was an American football team that represented Bowling Green State College (later renamed Bowling Green State University) as a member of the Northwest Ohio League (NOL) during the 1931 college football season. In its eighth season under head coach Warren Steller, the team compiled a 3–1–4 record (0–1–2 against NOL opponents), shut out six of eight opponents (including three scoreless ties), finished in third place out of four teams in the NOL, and outscored all opponents by a total of 31 to 21. Cliff Stevenson was the team captain.

Schedule

References

Bowling Green
Bowling Green Falcons football seasons
Bowling Green Falcons football